Randy Degg (born September 28, 1984) is a former American football player. He played as a center for Northwood University. He was signed as an undrafted free agent by the Fort Wayne Fusion in 2007.

College career
He played as a center for Northwood University. During his junior and senior seasons he was named to the NCAA Division II All-American team. He was a teammate of Robert Height.

Professional career

Fort Wayne Fusion
He was signed as an undrafted free agent by the Fort Wayne Fusion in 2007.

Amarillo Dusters
Degg started as the team's center in 2008.

Saginaw Sting
Degg returned to the state of Michigan, and played with many of his former college teammates again, as the Saginaw Sting were preparing to move to the Indoor Football League after a 2008 CIFL Championship victory.

Jacksonville Sharks
In 2009, Degg signed with the Jacksonville Sharks. He is the franchises only Center, and started all 16 regular season games and one playoff game for the Sharks. Degg also doubles as the Sharks’ long-snapper for the kicking game. In 2011 Degg was named first team All AFL and won the ArenaBowl with the Jacksonville Sharks.

External links
 Jacksonville Sharks Bio

1984 births
Living people
American football centers
American football defensive linemen
American football long snappers
Fort Wayne Fusion players
Amarillo Dusters players
Jacksonville Sharks players
People from Pinconning, Michigan
Players of American football from Michigan
Northwood Timberwolves football players
Saginaw Sting players